Dalcross Castle is a restored 17th century  tower house, about  southwest of Croy, Highland, Scotland, and about  northeast of Inverness. The castle stands on a ridge.

History
The Frasers of Lovat owned the property and the 8th Lord Lovat built a castle here in 1620, but it passed to the Mackintoshes soon after.  Prior to the battle of Culloden the Hanoverian troops mustered here in 1746.

The house was abandoned, and became ruinous, but it was restored and reoccupied in the 20th century, by descendants of the Mackintosh lairds. The restoration of the castle was probably by W L Carruthers, in 1896.

The castle became a category A listed building on 5 October 1971, and the entrance arch and gate lodge became a category C listed building 17 April 1986. In 1987 it was also listed as a Inventory of Gardens and Designed Landscapes in Scotland.

It was bought in 1996 and modernised by Maxwell & Company Architects. The project was completed in 2003.

By 2008 the castle was available for up to 12 guests to stay in.

Structure

Although referred to as an L-plan castle, it may be better described as two offset wings joined at the corner.  One wing has five storeys and an attic, while the other has three, their connection being a projecting square tower, which has a bartizan, and is topped by a garbled watch-chamber, this creates two re-entrant angles. There have been extensions since the castle was originally built, including a two-storey 18th-century addition to the north gable.

There are many gunloops and shot-holes in the walls, while many windows still have their iron yetts.
At the foot of the square stair-tower is the entrance from the courtyard, leading to a vaulted basement.  This basement contains cellars, a kitchen with a large arched fireplace, and a wine cellar with a small staircase to the fine first storey hall, which may also be reached by the wide main stair. above.  The ashlar chimney piece has a moulded surround a coat of arms, and the motto, “Je Trouve Bien”. The upper bedroom quarters may be reached  by a small turnpike stair.  A massive chimney stack tops the east wall of the north wing.

The building is of red rubble, with tooled and polished ashlar dressings.  The doorway has filletted roll to moulded door jambs, and stepped hood mould.  The panel above the doorway shows the date 1720.

Some windows, including dormers, were added in 1896.

There are gardens surrounded by a coped wall of red rubble.

References

Further reading

External links

 
 https://www.scotland-inverness.co.uk/Chatelaine/DALCROSS.HTM
 https://scotlandsplaces.gov.uk/record/hes/14152/dalcross-castle/rcahms
 Dalcross Castle and Dalcross Castle, Tin House, Laundry & Game Larders Canmore entries

Castles in Highland (council area)
Category A listed buildings in Highland (council area)
Listed castles in Scotland
Tower houses in Scotland